Villu Reiljan (born 23 May 1953 in Võru) is a former Estonian politician. He has been member of VIII, IX and X Riigikogu. From 1995 to 1999 and from 2003 to 2006, he was the Minister of Environment.

In 1975 he graduated from Estonian Agricultural Academy in forest management.

He was a member of the People's Union of Estonia. His older brother was an economist and politician, Janno Reiljan.

References

1953 births
Living people
Members of the Riigikogu, 2007–2011
People from Võru
People's Union of Estonia politicians
Environment ministers of Estonia
Estonian University of Life Sciences alumni
Members of the Riigikogu, 1995–1999
Members of the Riigikogu, 1999–2003
Members of the Riigikogu, 2003–2007